David Saville Muzzey (1870–1965) was an American historian. His history textbooks were used by millions of American children. He was accused of being a "bolshevik" by the Better America Federation. He also served as senior leader at the New York Society for Ethical Culture.

References

External links

1870 births
1965 deaths
People from Lexington, Massachusetts
Harvard University alumni
Ethical movement
Historians from Massachusetts